Ri Il-song (born 14 January 2004) is a North Korean footballer who plays as a forward.

Career
Ri first rose to prominence after scoring two goals for the April 25 under-15 team in a 3–1 win over the South Korean Gangwon-do representative team.

A fast-paced winger, he made his first mark on the international stage at qualification for the 2020 AFC U-16 Championship, scoring five goals in only three appearances, including a hat-trick in a resounding 16–0 win over Guam.

Before the effects of the COVID-19 pandemic in North Korea, Ri had planned to move abroad to Spain to pursue a career in professional football. However, by the time English newspaper The Guardian had named him as one of the 60 best young players in the world in October 2021, Ri had not played football at all in over a year.

References

2004 births
Living people
North Korean footballers
Association football forwards
April 25 Sports Club players
North Korea youth international footballers